Miková is a village and municipality in Stropkov District in the Prešov Region of north-eastern Slovakia.

History
In historical records the village was first mentioned in 1390. It was known as Mikova until 1899.

The village is perhaps best known as the ancestral village of the American artist Andy Warhol, whose parents both emigrated from Miková in the early 20th century.

Geography
The municipality lies at an altitude of 415 metres and covers an area of 12.715 km². It has a population of about 158 people.

Notable people
 Julia Warhola, artist, mother of the artists Andy Warhol and John Warhola, great-aunt of the artist James Warhola

References

External links
 
 
 https://web.archive.org/web/20071116010355/http://www.statistics.sk/mosmis/eng/run.html

Villages and municipalities in Stropkov District